Doliops octomaculata is a species of beetle in the family Cerambycidae. It was described by Breuning in 1928.

References

Doliops
Beetles described in 1928